Fernando Villalona, the first artist named "El Mayimbe" (born in Loma de Cabrera, Dajabón Province on May 7, 1955, Ramón Fernando Villalona Évora), is a Dominican merengue singer who began singing in the early 1970s, his popularity started to grow by the late 1970s and has not declined ever since. 

Songs such as "Tabaco y Ron," "Celos," "Te Amo Demasiado," "La Hamaquita," "Dominicano Soy," "Sonámbulo," and "Carnaval" among others became popular in the 1980s.  "Quisqueya," "No Podrás," "Música Latina," "Retorno," and "Me he Enamorado" were some of his biggest hits in the 1990s. In recent years he has had some health problems making performing a difficult task. But besides the fact that he has not been able to perform frequently, he probably still is the most important merengue singer in Dominican history. He was married to Evelyn Jorge a woman of Puerto Rican origin and they have a daughter named Paloma.

Career
Fernando began singing at a very early age and became popular after participating in "El Festival de la Voz", an amateur TV talent show. After that, merengue icon Wilfrido Vargas hired him to be part of his group Los Hijos del Rey but Fernando and the group would soon be separated after his popularity became larger than the group itself. He would then go into a period of drugs and isolation but never stopped singing, recording some of his best music during that period.  In 2012, Villalona recorded "El Color de tu Mirada" with American singer/songwriter Victoria Daly.  The music video was directed by Rene Brea in the Dominican Republic.  It went to be nominated for "Best Music Video" at the Soberano Awards in 2013.  Villalona began recording two singles with Latin sensation, Olga Tañon.  Recording began in April, set to be released on her upcoming album.

We Are The World & Religious album 
Fernando Villalona participated in the "We are the World" Spanish version, along with other superstars like Shakira, Ricky Martin, and Enrique Iglesias.
In 2011 he celebrates 40 years in the music business and decided on making a Christian album and in October 2011 he released "Mi Luz” the religious album praises God and he sings about his past troubled life and how his life has changed over the years.
Raul Jurany Wrote the song "Me He enamorado" And gave it to him.

"El Color de Tu Mirada"
Fernando Villalona recorded "El Color de Tu Mirada" with American singer/songwriter, Victoria Daly.  The song was written specifically for Victoria Daly by Gilberto de Ose to be sung with Villalona.  The music video was filmed and directed by René Brea in the Dominican Republic. It was released late November/early December.  The music video went on to be nominated for the 2013 Soberano Awards in April.

Discography
 La Tuerca (1981)
 ¡Feliz Cumbé! (1982)
 El Mayimbe''' (1982)
 ...Así Soy Yo! (1983)
 Fernandito... Canta al Amor (1983)
 Fernandito (1984)
 Ayer y Hoy (1984)
 ¡A la Carga! (1985)
 Para Mi Pueblo... Todo (1986)
 La Cartita (1987)
 Romántico (1988)
 Esta Es Mi Historia (1989)
 Todo (1990)
 El Niño Mimado (1993)
 Confundido (1995)
 Soy Un Hombre Feliz (1996)
 Bolerísimo (1996)
 Amigo (1998)
 Nací Para Cantar (1999)
 El Mayimbe En Bachata (2000)
 Mal Acostumbrado (2002)
 15 Grandes Éxitos (2004)
 El Gran Mayimbe (2007)
 Mi Luz (2011)
   

 Compilations
 15 Grandes Éxitos (2004)
 El Gran Mayimbe'' (2007)

See also 
 List of people from the Dominican Republic

References

20th-century Dominican Republic male singers
People from Loma de Cabrera
Dominican Republic performers of Christian music
Merengue musicians
Dominican Republic people of Spanish descent
Latin music songwriters
1955 births
Living people
21st-century Dominican Republic male singers